The Cetina culture is the name for the culture of the inhabitants of the Middle Dalmatian coast, and especially its hinterland, during the early Bronze Age (1900 to 1600 BC), or, according to Paul Reineck's chronology, Br A1 - A2/B1 (2200. – 1500 BC.). It is named after the numerous sites along the Cetina river in Central Dalmatia and Herzegovina. People of this culture were present in caves (Škarin Samograd near Drniš, Gudnja near Ston, Ravlić cave in Drinovci) or in open settlements (Gradac in Kotorac and Krstina near Posušje). The graves are in rocky colonies. In the case of inhumation, they have the shape of a stone chest, while incinerated remains of the deceased are laid in clay pots.

Area of diffusion

The largest number of well-known sites of Cetina culture is located in the interior of Dalmatia, primarily between the upper stream of the Cetina river and the lower Neretva river. Individual finds are documented on Central Dalmatian islands, Palagruza, Northern Adriatic, deep in the interior of the Western Balkans, Albania, Southern and Eastern Italy, and Greece.

Settlements

Settlements are the least known aspect of Cetina culture. The most significant deposits of Cetina culture were discovered in the Škarin Samograd cave located at the foot of the Mogli brdo, six kilometers northwest of Unešić. The amount of findings collected in other researched settlements, mostly caves, suggests mainly temporary inhabitation. The stratigraphy of Škarin Samograd enabled Ivan Marovic and Borivoj Covic to produce a three-phase periodization of Cetina culture, which is still used.

Genetics
Mathieson et al. 2018 archaeogenetic study included three samples from Dalmatia: two Early & Middle Bronze Age (1631-1521/1618-1513 calBCE) samples from Veliki Vanik (near Vrgorac) and one Iron Age (805-761 calBCE) sample from Jazinka Cave in Krka National Park. According to ADMIXTURE analysis they had approximately 60% Early European Farmers, 33% Western Steppe Herders and 7% Western Hunter-Gatherer-related ancestry. The male individual from Veliki Vanik carried the Y-DNA haplogroup J2b2a1-L283 while his and two female individuals mtDNA haplogroup were I1a1, W3a1 and HV0e. Freilich et al. (2021) identify the Veliki Vanik samples as related to Cetina culture. They carry similar ancestry to a Copper Age sample from the site of Beli Manastir-Popova Zemlja (late Vučedol culture), eastern Croatia. The same autosomal profile persists in the Iron Age sample from Jazinka cave. Lazaridis et al. (2022) examined 18 samples from Bronze Age Cetina valley and confirmed previous conclusions. Out of 10 males whose Y-DNA was successfully extracted, 9 belonged to haplogroup J2 (mainly J2b2a1-L283 subclades) and 1 to haplogroup R1b1a1b1a-Z2118. Their and female individuals mtDNA haplogroups were 2x H, H13a2a, H5, H6a1, 3x H6a1a, HV0e, 6x J1c1, N1a1a1, T1a1 and U5a1a.

See also
Illyrians

References

Bibliography
Borivoj Čović: Od Butmira do Ilira, Sarajevo, 1976.
Stašo Forenbaher - Timonthy Kaiser: Palagruža, jadranski moreplovci i njihova kamena industrija na prijelazu iz bakrenog u brončano doba, Opuscula archaeologica, 21, Zagreb, 1997, 15–28 https://hrcak.srce.hr/en/5438
Blagoje Govedarica, Rano bronzano doba na području istočnog Jadrana, Sarajevo, 1989.
Blagoje Govedarica: Keramika cetinskog tipa u unutrašnjosti zapadnog Balkana i problem kulturno-istorijske interpretacije praistorijskih nalaza, Godišnjak Centra za balkanološka ispitivanja Akademije nauka i umjetnosti Bosne i Hercegovine, 35, Sarajevo, 2006., str. 95-114  
Nives Majnarić Pandžić: Brončano doba, u: Stojan Dimitrijević, Tihomila Težak-Gragl, Nives Majnarić Pandžić: Povijest umjetnosti u Hrvatskoj - Prapovijest, Zagreb, 1998., 159-219
Joseph Maran - Seaborne Contacts between the Aegean, the Balkans and the Central Mediterranean in the 3rd Millennium BC; The Unfolding of the Mediterranean World, u I. Galanaki, H. Tomas, Y. Galanakis, and R. Laffineur (ur.), Between the Aegean and Baltic Seas: Prehistory across Borders (Aegaeum 27), Liège/Austin, 2007, str. 3-21 
Brunislav Marijanović: Cetinska kultura - rana faza, - samostalna kultura ili integralni dio eneolitika, Radovi Filozofskog fakulteta, Razdio povijesnih znanosti, Sv. 36/23 (1997.), Zadar, 1998. 
Ivan Marović: Prethistorijska istraživanja u okolici Narone, Dolina rijeke Neretve od prethistorije do ranog srednjeg vijeka, Izdanja Hrvatskog arheološkog društva, 5, 1980, str. 45-104
Ivan Marović: Istraživanja kamenih gomila Cetinske kulture u srednjoj Dalmaciji, Vjesnik za historiju i arheologiju dalmatinsku, sv. 84, Split, 1991., str. 15-214
Ivan Marović, Borivoj Čović: Cetinska kultura, Praistorija jugoslavenskih zemalja, IV, Sarajevo, 1983., str. 191-231
Darko Periša: Prikaz – Stojan Dimitrijević, Tihomila Težak-Gregl, Nives Majnarić Pandžić: Prapovijest, Zagreb, 1998., Vjesnik za arheologiju i historiju dalmatinsku, 93, Split, 2001., 555-562
Darko Periša: Brunislav Marijanović, Prilozi za prapovijest u zaleđu jadranske obale, Arheološki vestnik, 54, 2003., str. 422-438 
Ksenija Vinski-Gasparini: Litzen-keramima savsko-dravskog međurječja, Praistorija jugoslavenskih zemalja, IV, Sarajevo, 1983., 484-491

Archaeological cultures of Southeastern Europe
Bronze Age cultures of Europe
Archaeological cultures in Albania
Archaeological cultures in Bosnia and Herzegovina
Archaeological cultures in Croatia
History of Dalmatia